Basketball events at the 1976 Summer Olympics was the ninth appearance of the sport of basketball as an official Olympic medal event. It took place from July 18 to July 27 at the Centre Étienne Desmarteau and the Montreal Forum in Montreal, Quebec, Canada. Women's basketball was introduced to the Olympic program for the first time at this Games. The United States won the gold against Yugoslavia in the men's tournament, while the Soviet Union won the gold medal against the United States in the women's competition.

Medal summary

Qualification
A single NOC may enter up to one men's team with 12 players and up to one women's team with 12 players. Automatic qualifications were granted to the host country for both events plus the three medal winners from the previous Olympic Games for the men's tournament, and the three first places at the 1975 FIBA World Championship for the women's tournament. Additional spots for the men's tournament were decided via the continental qualification tournaments held by FIBA and an extra qualifying tournament held in Hamilton, Canada months prior to the contest. The remaining slots for the women's competition were also assigned via another tournament held in the same city.

Men

Women

 Egypt withdrew from the Olympic Games after one match, following the boycott of several African countries against New Zealand. All matches involving Egypt were then forfeited.
 Puerto Rico qualified after winning the silver medal at the 1975 Pan American Games, since the gold medal went to the United States, who had already qualified.
 Replaced China.

Format
Men's tournament:
 Two groups of six teams are formed, where the top two from each group advance to the semifinals.
 Third and fourth places from each group form an additional bracket to decide 5th–8th places in the final ranking.
 Fifth and sixth places from each group form an additional bracket to decide 9th–12th places in the final ranking.

Women's tournament:
 One round-robin group is formed containing all six teams, where the final standings are decided.

Tie-breaking criteria:
 Head to head results
 Goal average (not the goal difference) between the tied teams
 Goal average of the tied teams for all teams in its group

Men's tournament

Preliminary round
The first two places in each of the preliminary round groups advanced to the semifinals, where Group A teams would meet Group B teams. The Soviet Union and the United States, two of the powerhouses at this tournament, finished the preliminary round undefeated. The host nation, Canada, also qualified for the semifinals together with Yugoslavia.

Egypt played only one match, against Czechoslovakia, and then flew home supporting the boycott of several African countries. Their remaining matches were forfeited.

Group A

Group B

Knockout stage

Championship bracket

Classification brackets
5th–8th Place

9th–12th Place

 Forfeited match.

Women's tournament

The first Olympic Basketball Tournament for Women consisted of a single round-robin group, where final standings were determined by the group rankings. The Soviet team finished undefeated and won the gold medal, while the American team won the silver medal through a victory over the Bulgarian team that broke the tie between the two teams in favor of the American team.

Final standings

See also
 Basketball at the 1976 Summer Olympics – Men's team rosters
 Basketball at the 1976 Summer Olympics – Women's team rosters

References
Official Olympic Report

 
basketball
1976
1976 in basketball
International basketball competitions hosted by Canada